Phialanthus is a genus of flowering plants in the family Rubiaceae. There are about 20 species, 17 of which occur in Cuba.

Species include:
Phialanthus acunae
Phialanthus alainii
Phialanthus bissei
Phialanthus ellipticus
Phialanthus glaberrimus
Phialanthus grandifolius
Phialanthus guantanamensis
Phialanthus hispaniolae
Phialanthus inflatus
 Phialanthus jamaicensis Urb.
Phialanthus linearis
Phialanthus lineraris
Phialanthus macrocalyx
Phialanthus macrostemon
Phialanthus marianus
Phialanthus myrtilloides
Phialanthus oblongatus
Phialanthus parvifolius
Phialanthus peduncularis
Phialanthus resinifluus
 Phialanthus revolutus Urb.
Phialanthus rigidus
Phialanthus stillans

References

 
Rubiaceae genera
Taxonomy articles created by Polbot